Borovsko may refer to:

 Borovsko, Bosnia and Herzegovina
Borovsko, Kardzhali Province, Bulgaria